The Bangladesh Space Research and Remote Sensing Organization, or SPARRSO, is a state agency concerned with astronomical research and the application of space technology in Bangladesh. SPARRSO works closely with JAXA, NASA and the ESA in environmental and meteorological research. Using Japanese and American satellites, SPARRSO monitors agro-climatic conditions and water resources in Bangladesh.

Activities
Broad Category of SPARRSO Activities

Category 1: Operational Activities towards National Interest

Category 2: Research & Technological Development Activities

Category 3: Activities to Support National Development

Category 4: Nation Building Mile Stone Activities of SPARRSO

Category 5: Human Resource Development on RS & GIS Technology

Commandment
 SPARRSO has been applying space and remote sensing technology, in the field of Agriculture, Forestry, Fisheries, Geology, Cartography, Water Resources, Land use, Weather, Environment, Geography, Oceanography, Science, Education, science-based Knowledge and other related space research areas. It also performs research on these activities for developing this technology and its practical application.
 Provides necessary information and disseminates research results to the Government and different relevant user agencies.
 It provides the Government information about the development of space and remote sensing technology in other countries and gives advice for the formulation of national policy to the Government.
 Conducts training, technical research, and surveys, and  cooperates with national or international organizations or institutes in the relevant matter.
 SPARRSO creates development projects to perform research activities on space and remote sensing technology and implements them with approval from the Government.
 SPARRSO takes measures regarding the above-mentioned work as it feels necessary.

Divisions
At present, there are total 17 working divisions in SPARRSO. They are:

 Atmospheric Division
 Agriculture Division
 Agro-hydrometeorology Division
 Forestry Division
 Water Resources Division
 Oceanography Division
 Fisheries Division
 Cartography Division
 Ground Station Division
 Photographic Division
 Ocean Physics Division
 Instrumentation and Data Processing Division
 Ground Truth Division
 Geology Division
 Rocket Technology Development Division
 Space Physics & Rocket Dynamics Division
 Regional Remote Sensing Center (RRSC)

Ground stations
Here is the list of total ground stations at SPARRSO:
 Geostationary Satellite
 MTSAT-2 of Japan
 FY-2D & FY-2E of China
 WINDS of Japan.
 Polar Orbiting Satellite.
 NOAA Series of USA
 Terra & Aqua of USA.
 MetOp of Europe

Research
SPARRSO conducts research works on various aspects of geo-disciplinary subject areas of RS-GIS technologies.

The research items includes technological development on RS-GIS algorithms, with the aim to develop better techniques for geoinformation retrieval along with effective approaches towards fruitful application of such technology.

See also
 Bangabandhu-1
 List of government space agencies

References

External links
Official website of SPARRSO

Space agencies
Bangladeshi research organisations
Government agencies established in 1980
Government agencies of Bangladesh
1980 establishments in Bangladesh
Science and technology in Bangladesh